Israel Schwartz was a man who, in 1888, claimed to have witnessed an assault on a London woman that is believed to be tied to the Jack the Ripper slayings and one of the few people who might have had a good look at the murderer. Though he was described at the time as being from Hungary, 1891 census entries show him as being Polish and of Jewish descent.

Schwartz would officially testify to the police the following: shortly after midnight on September 30, he was walking down a street when he saw a man stop and speak to a woman who was standing in a gateway. Schwartz stated that the man then threw the woman to the ground. Schwartz crossed the street and began walking away when the attacker saw him. The attacker called out the name "Lipski" — apparently an anti-Semitic insult related to Israel Lipski's murder of a woman the year before. Schwartz reported seeing another man smoking a pipe nearby at the time, and that this man started walking towards Schwartz, possibly following him, prompting Schwartz to run away.

Schwartz described the possible murderer as being around 30-years-old with a height of around 5 feet and 5 inches, fair complexion, dark hair, small brown moustache, with a full face and broad shouldered.

Shortly after the time that Schwartz claimed this incident had happened, the body of Elizabeth Stride was found in the same location. That same day Schwartz identified Stride's body as that of the woman he had seen attacked and gave testimony to the police about what he had seen. He was able to give descriptions of both men but was unable to say whether they knew each other or had been working together.

Several years after the crimes, Commissioner Robert Anderson claimed in his autobiography The Lighter Side of My Official Life that the Ripper had been identified by "the only person who ever had a good view of the murderer." Chief Inspector Donald Swanson, in marginalia found in his personal copy of Anderson's book, stated that the witness in question was Jewish. Some Ripperologists have concluded that Schwartz was most likely the man being referred to, although a number of other people, primarily Joseph Lawende, have also been suggested.

In 2006, it would also be speculated in a new book that Swanson had identified the Ripper as being a Jewish barber named Aaron Kosminski. It was also speculated that Schwartz had identified but then refused to testify against him; with the authors speculating that Schwartz refused to testify because it would likely have caused the death of a fellow Jew. This theory has never been verified.

References

Bibliography

See also
List of proposed Jack the Ripper suspects

Crime witnesses
Hungarian emigrants to England
Hungarian Jews
Jack the Ripper